The Parent Washington Navel Orange Tree is a tree grown by Eliza Tibbets in Riverside, California, in 1873. The Riverside County tree was designated a California Historic Landmark (No.20) on June 1, 1932, at the corner of Magnolia Street and Arlington Street, Riverside. The Bahia, Brazil, Washington navel orange was brought to the United States by the U.S. Department of Agriculture in 1870. The Department of Agriculture imported twelve trees; from these trees, some buds were grafted on to California sweet orange trees. The Washington Navel Orange is also called California Navel Orange.

The navel orange is a mutation of regular sweet orange. This mutated orange was discovered in a monastery orchard in Brazil in 1820. In 1870 a cutting from the navel orange was sent to Washington, D.C., thus was called the Washington navel orange. The name "navel orange" is from the mutation at the bottom blossom end of the orange. The  bottom of the orange has a depression which looks like a human belly button. The mutation gives the navel orange no seeds. The Washington navel oranges were shipped all over the United States. As oranges cannot withstand freezing weather, the climate of Southern California is good for the Californian citrus industry and the navel orange.

Marker
Marker on the Riverside, California site reads:
NO. 20 PARENT WASHINGTON NAVEL ORANGE TREE – The tree was introduced into the United States from Bahia, Brazil, by the U.S. Department of Agriculture in 1870. Twelve young trees were received and buds from them were propagated on sweet orange seedlings. In 1873 two of these greenhouse-grown trees, which were distributed throughout the United States, were sent to Mrs. Eliza Tibbets in Riverside.

See also
California Citrus State Historic Park
California Historical Landmarks in Riverside County, California
Mother Orange Tree
Orcutt Ranch Horticulture Center

References

History of Riverside, California
Landmarks in Riverside, California
California Historical Landmarks
1873 establishments in California
Individual trees in California
Agriculture in California
Economic history of California